Kuch Toh Log kahenge (English: People Will Talk) is an Indian Hindi-language romantic comedy/family drama television series on Sony Entertainment Television India. It premiered on 3 October 2011 and ended on 28 March 2013. The series revolves around a team of doctors working at Dr. Kotnis General Hospital in Lucknow. The show was loosely based on the Pakistani television drama Dhoop Kinare.<ref>{{cite web|url=https://www.mid-day.com/articles/kuch-toh-log-set-to-recreate-dhoop-kinare-magic-on-tv/135189|title=Kuch to log kahenge set to recreate dhoop kinara magic|work=Mid-Day}}</ref>

 Plot Kuch Toh Log Kahenge'' is a love story revolving around a team of doctors working at Dr. Kotnis General Hospital in Lucknow.

Former college friends Dr. Ashutosh Mathur and Dr. Malika Trehan work at the same hospital. Dr. Ashutosh is a workaholic and hard-hearted man, owing to some sad past events in his life. He doesn't want any nonsense, enjoyment, or fun at the hospital or in his life. Dr. Malika secretly loves Dr. Ashutosh. She expresses this indirectly by stating that she has been waiting for him for 12 years, but Ashutosh does not express any kind of willingness to marry her. 

Life starts changing for Ashutosh when a young intern, Dr. Nidhi Verma (Kritika Kamra), joins the hospital. Nidhi is a fun-loving, jovial person and at times irritates Ashutosh with her childish ways of handling the Children Ward. Ashutosh warns Nidhi a few times to behave herself, but she does not improve. Ashutosh and Nidhi slowly start having a good time with each other, and Ashutosh develops feelings for Nidhi even though he is 18 years older than her. He doesn't express his feelings for her because of their age difference. 

Malika realizes that Ashutosh is getting closer to Nidhi and decides to make Nidhi's life hard by giving her extra work and assigning her night duties. Her sister-in-law, Suhasini, keeps provoking Malika to make Ashutosh realize that loving a girl almost half his age is wrong and it won't work at any cost. Malika somehow convinces Ashutosh to eliminate Nidhi from the hospital because they cannot have any future. Ashutosh terminates Nidhi's internship, stating mistakes Nidhi has made and telling her that her behavior in the hospital is no longer tolerable. Nidhi is hurt and angry with Ashutosh for behaving in this way. 

Dadi Bua does not want to see Nidhi upset and thus decides to call Rohan to their home. Initially, Nidhi finds Rohan very irritating and doesn't talk to him. However, they both love to eat noodles in the middle of the night, and often Nidhi develops a trust in Rohan. They  became good friends and start sharing things. 

Ashutosh's childhood friend, Armaan, also arrives in Lucknow and starts living with Ashutosh. Slowly and gradually, Armaan and Rohan come to know about Ashutosh and Nidhi's love for each other. Ashutosh feels bad about terminating Nidhi and thus recommends her to City Centre General Hospital. Both of them again meet in Mumbai at a medical conference, where Malika tells Nidhi that she got the new job because of Ashutosh's recommendation. Nidhi feels even more hurt and resigns from that job. 

Later, Nidhi learns about a house that was named for her by an unknown man, who in fact was Ashutosh's father, Dr. Ashish Mathur. Ashutosh wanted the house at any cost but was completely unaware that Nidhi was the owner. He consulted his lawyer, Sanjeevani, to get his house back, but Sanjeevani could not help him. 

Nidhi's father, Colonel Yograj Verma, had married Dr. Mathur's daughter during his army days. However, Dr. Mathur rejected their marriage and abandoned his daughter for choosing marriage over career and going against his will. After the birth of Nidhi, her mother passed away. Since then, Col. Verma held a serious grudge against Dr. Mathur, whom he viewed as responsible for the situation. 

In the interim, Kotnis General Hospital's Admin, Dr. Rangnath, and Nidhi's childhood friend, Anjilika Solanki (Anji), start working with each other to design uniforms. Dr. Rangnath has a huge crush on Anji, but she dislikes his tendency to flirt with girls. However, after some time, she develops feelings for him, which she does not disclose to him.

One day Rohan and Armaan meet each other at Kotnis hospital. After understanding the history, they shake hands and decide to make Ashutosh and Nidhi recognize each other's love. Both Rohan and Armaan try to persuade Nidhi and Ashutosh to express their love, but Nidhi and Ashutosh each believe it is already over. Rohan and Armaan plan to patch up Ashutosh and Nidhi at Lucknow Darbar. They enter a mosque to listen to Qawali, and Nidhi and Ashutosh meet again. Taking advantage of the situation, Rohan and Armaan face both of them and confirm that Ashutosh and Nidhi love each other. Ashutosh and Nidhi also confess their love, and they  start spending quality time with each other.

Anji's mother, Shyama Solanki, observes this relationship closely and advises Nidhi to disclose it to Col. Verma and Dadi Bua as soon as possible. Nidhi keeps asking for more time because she does not have the courage to disclose it to her family, whom she believes will never accept Ashutosh.

Later Malika learns about the relationship. With  constant provoking from Suhasini, she tries to force Ashutosh to do things that make him feel uncomfortable but make Nidhi happy. However Malika's plans fails as Ashutosh and Nidhi try to adjust things to save their relationship despite facing embarrassment.

Meanwhile, Col. Verma receives a huge export order, and to complete it, he takes a bank loan. The bank manager turns out to be Malika's brother, Aditya Trehan. Malika finds out about the loan when she meets Aditya on the same day that Col. Verma comes to the bank with his parther, Mr. Mansukhani,  to take the loan.

Ashutosh is constantly forcing his lawyer, Sanjeevani, to get him his house, and Sanjeevani has been in touch with Mr. Mansukhani to get the house sold. Mansukhani knows that the house belonged to Nidhi. Mansukhani is a very greedy man, so to earn huge commission from the house, he decides to target rejection of Col. Verma's order so that to repay the loan, they will have no option but to sell the house.

Col. Verma asks Anji to check some samples since she is a fashion designer. Mansukhani and his assistant, Chandak, trick Anji and Col. Verma by showing them good-quality samples, but later they blackmail the supplier to use inferior material with a promise to give him a commission.

The quality officer tells Col. Verma that he will come soon to check the samples. Col. Verma again asks Anji to check the samples, and she is shocked to find that the samples were not those shown to her. She informs Col. Verma, who gets tense. Col. Verma does not have time to replace the samples, so the quality officer rejects the full order. Col. Verma decides not to share this with anyone and asks Anji to stay quiet.

Now, Col. Verma's relative Mandira comes to Lucknow. Mandira had married a man who was double her age, and because of this, Dadi Bua and Col. Verma had broken their relationship with her. However, Col. Verma feels sorry for her and asks her to come home. But Dadi Bua insults her and asks her to leave. Ashutosh is present during this drama and realizes that it won't be easy to convince Nidhi's family to accept his marriage to Nidhi. Col. Verma once in a conversation had told Nidhi that he would never accept such a relationship. However she still holds hope when Ashutosh assures her that he will speak to her family soon.

Malika continues feeling jealous of the growing love between Ashutosh and Nidhi, and she keeps blackmailing Aditya Trehan to force Col. Verma to repay his loan without any delay. Aditya unwittingly warns Col. Verma that if he fails to repay the loan, the bank will take steps to recover it by attaching his property and dismissing his family from their home. Col. Verma suffers from hypertension because of the pressure but decides to stay quiet.

Meanwhile, Ashutosh discloses the situation about the house to Nidhi and takes her to see it. Nidhi is shocked to see that it is the same house that she owns. She plans to give Ashutosh his house back on New Year's Eve and plans a programme at the house. But before reaching there, she gets a call that Col. Verma has suffered a heart attack owing to  increasing pressure from the bank to repay the loan. This spoils her plan and makes Ashutosh very angry. He feels that Nidhi played a prank on him. Armaan tries to convince Ashutosh otherwise, but he refuses to believe him.

Because of Malika's constant blackmailing, Aditya Trehan now tries to force Nidhi to repay the loan in three or four days; otherwise, he says he will have to take extreme steps to recover the loan. Nidhi talks to Mansukhani, and he suggests Nidhi sell her house as the only solution left to repay the loan. Nidhi receives a call from a man named Sandeep Bagchi (Vinay Jain), and he buys the house from her. This helps Nidhi to repay the loan, and Col. Verma now recovers from his illness.

Later, Dadi Bua starts believing than Rohan and Nidhi like each other because of their good friendship and secretly plans their engagement with Col. Verma without informing them. She calls Rohan's parents to Lucknow to see Nidhi. Rohan's father is stubborn and does not allow Rohan to speak against him. On the day of engagement, Shyama informs Nidhi about this, and she is heartbroken. Rohan is also shocked and objects but his father does not listen to him. 

Ashutosh is in Delhi because of an emergency, and when Nidhi tells him about the engagement, he assures her that on returning, he will come and convince her family. However, Ashutosh misses his return flight and decides to come by road. But he meets with a serious accident and goes missing.

Nidhi tells Col. Verma that she loves someone else and cannot accept this engagement. As a result, Col. Verma cancels the engagement. Nidhi reveals that she loves Ashutosh, which makes her family furious.

Rohan, Nidhi, and Anji start searching for Ashutosh but they cannot find him anywhere. The police inform them that Ashutosh is dead. The police found his broken phone and suitcase, but his body is found nowhere at the accident spot. Nidhi refuses to believe that Ashutosh is dead and starts searching for him again. Ashutosh (Sharad Kelkar) is found unconscious in a lake, and villagers manage to bring him to a village hospital. Nidhi finds him there and brings him to Kotnis Hospital. Dadi Bua and Col. Verma strictly refuse to allow Nidhi to meet Ashutosh, which disheartens her. 

Things get worse when Dadi Bua and Col. Verma take Nidhi to Kerala to forget Ashutosh. However, Ashutosh manages to go there too, with Armaan's and Anji's help. Ashutosh confronts Dadi Bua and Col. Verma, but they again refuse to accept him. Nidhi decides to break her relationship with Ashutosh and asks him to forget her and move on for their own good.

Meanwhile, it turns out that Sandeep Bagchi has actually bought the house for Malika. Malika decides to give the house to Ashutosh and gets a promise from him to do whatever she demands. Later their college colleague Jagan Mehta (Sachin Parikh) enters the hospital and expresses his love for Malika. Ashutosh has held a huge grudge against Jagan, whom he knows is not a trustworthy person. Jagan invites Ashutosh and Malika to his home for dinner, but instead humiliates Ashutosh. When Jagan expresses his wish to marry Malika, she refuses and tells him that she loves Ashutosh. Malika again asks Ashutosh about marriage, but when he refuses, she decides to marry Jagan.

By this point, Nidhi has started working at an nongovernmental organization, where she meets an old man who is suffering from Alzheimers. The man turns out to be Dr. Ashutosh's father, Dr. Mathur. Nidhi treats Dr. Mathur and helps him regain his memory about the house and Ashutosh. Nidhi helps Ashutosh meet his father and take him home. Dr. Mathur learns about Ashutosh and Nidhi's broken relationship and decides to correct things. He persuades Nidhi's family to agree to the marriage, but Col. Verma strictly refuses.

Making things worse for Nidhi, Rohan has started to fall in love with her and expresses his wish to marry her. Shyama informs Nidhi about this development, and she is astonished. She tells Rohan that she cannot think about anyone replacing Dr. Ashutosh and thus declines the proposal, leaving Rohan heartbroken. Then Nidhi decides she is fed up with the situation and becomes determined to leave India for a long time. When she tries to depart, Ashutosh reaches airport and asks Nidhi to stop. She ignores him.

However, Col. Verma stops Nidhi because he finally accepts her relationship with Ashutosh. Dadi Bua objects initially, but hesitantly accepts them for Nidhi's happiness. The couple finally marry. Rohan cannot stand to see this and secretly leaves the house, leaving a goodbye letter for Nidhi. For their honeymon, Ashutosh and Nidhi go to a forest, where they consummate their marriage.

Fate again intervenes in Nidhi and Ashutosh's married life when Ashutosh finds Malika in deteriorated condition. But when he follows Malika to stop her, he has a minor accident and injures his leg. He asks Nidhi to find Malika, who initially lies that she cannot find her. But to see her husband happy, she finally succeeds and brings Malika to the hospital. Anji is furious with Nidhi for doing this, but they patch up when Nidhi requests that Anji support her instead of blaming her.

Malika is still hopeful for Ashutosh, but she is in trauma because of severe physical abuse by Jagan. When Ashutosh is discharged from hospital, Malika cannot bear it and decides to commit suicide. Ashutosh decides to take Malika home until she recovers. Nidhi doesn't like the arrangement but remains silent. However, Malika starts faking her illness to get closer to Ashutosh and eliminate Nidhi from his life. Malika succeeds in creating regular arguments between Ashutosh and Nidhi, but they patch up every time, which disappoints Malika. 

Nidhi realizes Malika's illness is  a drama when she sees Malika throwing tablets out of the window. Nidhi decides to expose Malika. Malika, for her part, decides to kill Nidhi as the only way to get close to Ashutosh. She first tries to push Nidhi from a hill, but Nidhi is saved by Ashutosh. Then Malika orders sleeping pills from Purohit Chemist and mixes them in Nidhi's food. However, Dr. Rangnath is informed by the medical store that Malika has ordered sleeping pills without a prescription and tells Anji. Anji informs Nidhi, who suspects that Malika has poisoned her food and accuses Malika of this. When Ashutosh gets angry at Nidhi and attempts to eat the same food, Malika stops him and confesses her ill acts. Ashutosh eliminates her from his house.

Dr. Rangnath calls his parents to Lucknow to see Anji after her parents force him. Rangnath's parents are traditional and disapprove of Anji without even meeting her, since she's a modern girl and they want Rangnath to marry a village girl. They select a girl named Susila and ask her to live with them. Rangnath doesn't like Susila at all. Nidhi and Anji plan to put the city life craze into Susila's mind and they succeed. Susila tells Rangnath's parents that she wants to be a modern girl, but this develops a negative image in Rangnath's parents' mind and they eliminate her. 

Rangnath's parents finally agree to meet Anji. To impress Rangnath's parents, Anji starts behaving like a typical cultured and spiritual village girl, and she succeeds. Both families finally approve of the marriage. However, Anji's father, Kapil Solanki, and Rangnath's father have few heated arguments before the marriage. Finally Anji and Dr. Rangnath are happily married.

Meanwhile, Dadi Bua now has a wish to see Nidhi and Ashutosh have a child and keeps on reminding them about it. Ashutosh also wants a child (to bring back his lost childhood days), but Nidhi strictly refuses, saying her career is more important than motherhood at the time. She demands two years in which to develop her career, and Ashutosh hesitantly agrees. Nidhi rejoins Kotnis Hospital but is assigned admin work. Later she is accepted as an intern by Dr. Ashutosh. 

Jagan suddenly enters Ashutosh's cabin and blackmails him that Malika and he will not be spared. Jagan accuses Ashutosh of hiding Malika and saving her from him. But Ashutosh tells Jagan that he has not had any relationship with Malika since she tried killing Nidhi. Nidhi then asks Ashutosh to find Malika as an act of humanity. Ashutosh succeeds in finding Malika. However, Jagan follows him to find Malika's home. When Jagan visits Malika and starts blackmailing her, Ashutosh arrives with police officers, who arrest Jagan.

Since Malika is pregnant, Ashutosh decides to help her and frequently visits her, but Nidhi doesn't like this. She requests Ashutosh to stop meeting Malika as he had already done Malika a huge favor by shifting her to a new home and getting Jagan arrested. Ashutosh explains that he is helping Malika only because she is pregnant and might need help, but Nidhi disapproves. 

Suddenly Malika develops an immense pain and Ashutosh brings her to Kotnis Hospital. Nidhi is deeply hurt by, and a huge argument between her and Ashutosh ensues. Mallika realizes that Ashutosh and Nidhi are not talking to each because of her. She apologizes to Nidhi and says that she is going to Australia to live with her brother and will never bother either of them again.

Later, a patient, Amar Tiwari (Dheeraj Dhoopar) is injured in a shootout and is brought to the hospital by Nidhi. He gradually falls in love with Nidhi, but Nidhi does not pay much attention. To make Ashutosh feel jealous, however, she tries to be friendly with Amar. Ashutosh realizes Nidhi's plan and warns her that Amar seems to have a criminal background. He also changes Nidhi's duty. Finally, Ashutosh tells Amar that Nidhi is his wife and he should not try to come close to her. Amar's brother, Bajrang Tiwari, in fact is a criminal. He kidnaps Ashutosh and decides to kill him to allow Amar to come closer to Nidhi. When Amar realizes this, he informs Nidhi, and both reach the spot where they find Ashutosh fighting with Bajrang. Ashutosh is rescued but his left hand is injured when one of the gang members shoots him. Later, Nidhi and Ashutosh resolve their differences and she returns.

Nidhi discovers that Dr. Mathur was in love with a college friend, Dr. Aradhana Bhardwaj (Daksh Bhardwaj's mother)(Anju Mahendru), but did not marry her. She goes to Allahabad to Dr. Aradhana's clinic, tells her about Dr. Mathur, and asks her to come to Lucknow. Dr. Mathur tells Aradhana he had wanted to marry her but had to marry his principal's daughter to save him from humiliation. Aradhana feels sorry for misunderstanding Mathur for so many years.

Dr. Rangnath is terminated by Daksh Bhardwaj. Nidhi is angry with Daksh Bhardwaj and wants to know why Dr. Rangnath has been terminated. Daksh Bhardwaj tries to kill Nidhi. He is sentenced for try to Killing Mrs. Bhardwaj and his daughter.  Anjal is pregnant in Holi Day

The first season ends with Nidhi and Ashutosh celebrating their first wedding anniversary and confirming that Nidhi is pregnant.

Cast

Main
 Kritika Kamra as Dr. Nidhi Yograj Verma / Dr. Nidhi Ashutosh Mathur
 Mohnish Bahl (Last Episode 110) / Sharad Kelkar (Entry Episode 115 in Timing 19:05) as Dr. Ashutosh Mathur

Recrurring
 Ishita Sharma as Anjali Rangnath Acharya (née Solanki) (aka Anji): Fashion Designer
 Vishal Malhotra as Dr. Rangnath Acharya
 Alok Nath as Dr. Ashish Mathur: Ashutosh's father, father in law of Colonel. Yograj "Trilok" Verma, Nidhi's grand father
 Karan Wahi as Rohan Solanki: Nidhi's Well Wisher 
 Rukhsar Rehman as Dr. Mallika Trehan
 Dakssh Ajit Singh as Mr. Daksh Bharadwaj: Mr. Bharadwaj's son
 Anju Mahendru as Dr. Aradhana Bharadwaj: Mr. Bharadwaj's wife
 Aradhana Uppal as Divya Bharadwaj: Mr. Bharadwaj's daughter
 Riyanka Chanda as Lubna
 Puneet Tejwani as Aditya Trehan: Brother of Mallika
 Nitesh Pandey as Armaan: DR. Ashutosh's friend (Entry in Episode 45)
 Vijay Kashyap as Colonel. Yograj "Trilok" Verma: Nidhi's father
 Nandita Puri as Shyama Solanki: Anjali's mother
 Sanatan Modi as Kapil Solanki: Anjali's father
 Kavita Vaid as Saroj Raani Verma: Nidhi's Dadi bua
 Dheeraj Dhoopar as Amar Tiwari
 Rajshri Deshpande as Suhasini Trehan: Mallika's Sister-in-law
 Manasi Parekh as Mandira
 Sheeba Chaddha as Sanjeevani Garg: Lawer of Dr. Ashutosh's House
 Amardeep Jha as Nurse D'souza
 Tanya Abrol as Phoolan
 Vinay Jain as Sandeep Bagchi
 Yash Gera as Bajrang Tiwari
 Sonal Vengurlekar as Dr. Ahana
 Sheena Bajaj as Dr. Aditi Rai
 Abhay Bhargava as Dr. Dubey
 Kaushal Kapoor as Dr. Rangnath's father
 Sachin Parikh aa Jagan Mehta
 Laal Singh Maan as Arnav: Patient Mrs. Harnam's husband

Episode list

Run time of episodes is approximately 40 minutes.

References

External links 
 Kuch Toh Log Kahenge official information Website

Sony Entertainment Television original programming
2011 Indian television series debuts
2013 Indian television series endings
Indian medical television series